Hardins is an unincorporated community in Gaston County, North Carolina, United States.

References

Unincorporated communities in North Carolina
Unincorporated communities in Gaston County, North Carolina